is a retired Japanese professional shogi player who achieved the rank of 7-dan.

Shogi professional
On June 8, 2020, the Japan Shogi Association announced on its website that Itō had retired from professional shogi. His official retirement date was given as May 26, 2020.

Promotion history
The promotion history for Itō is as follows:
1974: 6-kyū
1978: 1-dan
1984, August 1: 4-dan
1991, April 8: 5-dan
2002, April 1: 6-dan
2017, April 1: 7-dan
2020, May 26: Retired

Awards and honors
In 2009, Itō received the Japan Shogi Association's "25 Years Service Award" for being an active professional for twenty-five years.

References

External links
 ShogiHub: Ito, Hirofumi
Hirofumi Itō Shogi School : Shogi school operarated by Itō in Yamatotakada, Nara.

Japanese shogi players
Living people
Professional shogi players
Professional shogi players from Nara Prefecture
1960 births
Retired professional shogi players